Charles Wogan (1698?–1752?) was a Jacobite soldier of fortune, also known as the Chevalier Wogan.

Early life
Wogan was the second son of William Wogan and his wife, Anne Gaydon. His great-grandfather, William Wogan of Rathcoffey (1544–1616), was twelfth in descent from Sir John Wogan, Chief Justice of Ireland.

Career as soldier
In 1715 Charles and his younger brother Nicholas took service under Colonel Henry Oxburgh, whose force surrendered to General Charles Wills at Preston on 14 November.

In the following April the grand jury of Westminster found a true bill against Wogan, and his trial for high treason was appointed to take place in Westminster Hall on 5 May 1716 (cf. Hist. Reg. Chron. Diary, p. 221). At midnight on the eve of the trial Wogan took part in the successful escape from Newgate prison planned by Brigadier Mackintosh. He was one of the lucky seven (out of the fifteen) who made good their escape, and for whose recapture a reward of 500 pounds was vainly offered (Griffith, Chronicles of Newgate, i. 313).

He succeeded in getting to France, where he took service in Dillon's regiment until 1718. In that year he followed the chevalier to Rome. At the close of the same year he served with Ormonde on a diplomatic mission to win a Russian princess's hand for the exiled prince James Francis Edward Stuart. He failed, and selected Maria Clementina Sobieska, granddaughter of the famous John Sobieski. Clementina, on her way to join the chevalier at Bologna, was arrested by the order of the emperor (to whom the goodwill of the British government was of paramount importance) at Innsbruck, whence Wogan, with three kinsmen, Richard Gaydon, Captain Missett, and Ensign Edward O'Toole, released her in a romantic manner (27 April 1719). For this exploit the pope, Clement XI, conferred upon Wogan the title of Roman senator (13 June 1719). James rewarded Wogan by a baronetcy.

Wogan then took service as a colonel in the Spanish army, and in 1723 distinguished himself at the relief of Santa Cruz, besieged by the Moors under the Bey Bigotellos. He was promoted to the rank of brigadier-general and made governor of La Mancha. Thence he sent to Jonathan Swift in 1732 a cask of Spanish wine and a parcel of his writings. Swift wrote him in return a characteristic letter deploring that he did not see his way to get Wogan's effusions published: ‘Dublin booksellers,’ he says, ‘have not the least notion of paying for copy.’ On 27 February 1733 Wogan despatched to Swift, in his capacity as the ‘mentor and champion of the Irish nation,’ a long budget of grievances (printed in Scott's Swift, xvii. 447–97). He followed this up with another cask of Spanish wine, the merits of which Swift acknowledged in another entertaining letter (ib. xviii. 341).

Later life
In 1746 the Chevalier Wogan was with the Duke of York at Dunkirk in the hope of being able to join Prince Charles Edward in England (see Stuart MSS. at Windsor, Wogan to Edgar, 1752). He seems to have returned to La Mancha, and to have died there soon after 1752.

References
Wogan, Charles (DNB00)

1690s births
1750s deaths
Baronets in the Jacobite peerage
Escapees from England and Wales detention
Jacobites